Milecastle 2 (Walker) was a milecastle of the Roman Hadrian's Wall.  No remains are currently visible, having been built over, but its probable location is at or near the junction of the A187 Fossway and Tunstall Avenue, in the parish of Wallsend.

Construction 
Milecastle 2 was a short-axis milecastle of unknown gateway type.  Short-axis milecastles were thought to have been constructed by the legio II Augusta who were based in Isca Augusta (Caerleon).

Northing: 6482, Easting: 2705

Excavations and investigations
1732 - Horsley surveyed the milecastle, noting visible remains and recording its position

1848 - Collingwood Bruce studied the wall and found the site to have been covered by a brick kiln.

1852-4 - Henry MacLauchlan surveyed the milecastle's position, reporting it as short-axis, and recorded.

1928 - FG Simpson attempted to locate the site, but despite the previous removal of the brick kiln, found only Roman occupation earth and debris.

Associated turrets 
Each milecastle on Hadrian's Wall had two associated turret structures.  These turrets were positioned approximately one-third and two-thirds of a Roman mile to the west of the Milecastle, and would probably have been manned by part of the milecastle's garrison.  The turrets associated with Milecastle 2 are known as Turret 2A and Turret 2B.

Turret 2A
No remains have been identified of Turret 2A.  Two locations have been suggested, one by Eric Birley in 1961,

based on Horsley's locations of Milecastle 2 and Milecastle 3,and an alternative by Grace Simpson in 1978, based on Maclauchlin's locations of Milecastle 2 and Milecastle 3.

Location:  (both locations lie within the same 100m grid square).

Turret 2B
No remains have been identified of Turret 2B.  Two locations have been suggested, one by Eric Birley in 1961,

based on Horsley's locations of Milecastle 2 and Milecastle 3,and an alternative by Grace Simpson in 1978, based on Maclauchlin's locations of Milecastle 2 and Milecastle 3.

Location: 
Alternative location:

Monument records

References

Bibliography

02